The 2015 Currie Cup qualification tournament was a competition organised by the South African Rugby Union which featured seven teams and was played between 12 June and 25 July 2015. The winner of the tournament would qualify for the 2015 Currie Cup Premier Division, while the remaining six teams would play in the 2015 Currie Cup First Division.

For the second season in succession, Griquas won the tournament to earn a place in the Premier Division.

Competition rules and information

The seven teams played each other once over the course of the qualification, either at home or away. Teams received four points for a win and two points for a draw. Bonus points were awarded to teams that scored 4 or more tries in a game, as well as to teams that lost a match by 7 points or less. Teams were ranked by log points, then points difference (points scored less points conceded).

The top team qualified for the 2015 Currie Cup Premier Division, while the other six teams qualified for the 2015 Currie Cup First Division.

In November 2014, the Kenya RFU revealed that they were in negotiations with SARU to enter a team in the competition. However, they withdrew from the 2015 Vodacom Cup due to financial considerations and were not included in the Currie Cup fixtures when those were released.

Teams

The same seven teams that took part in the 2014 Currie Cup qualification tournament also played in the 2015 edition.

The following teams took part in the 2015 Currie Cup qualification tournament:

Log
The final league standings for the 2015 Currie Cup qualification tournament are:

Round-by-round

The table below shows a team's progression throughout the season.

For each round, each team's cumulative points total is shown with the overall log position in brackets.

Fixtures and results

The following fixtures for the 2015 Currie Cup qualification series were released:

Round One

Round Two

Round Three

Round Four

Round Five

Round Six

Round Seven

Honours

The honour roll for the 2015 Currie Cup qualification tournament was as follows:

Players

Player statistics

The following table contain points which were scored in the 2015 Currie Cup qualification tournament:

Discipline

The following table contains all the cards handed out during the tournament:

Referees

The following referees officiated matches in the 2015 Currie Cup qualification series:

Rodney Boneparte
Ben Crouse
Stephan Geldenhuys
Quinton Immelman
AJ Jacobs
Pro Legoete
Francois Pretorius
Lourens van der Merwe
Marius van der Westhuizen
Jaco van Heerden

See also

 2015 Currie Cup Premier Division
 2015 Currie Cup First Division
 2015 Vodacom Cup
 2015 Under-21 Provincial Championship Group A
 2015 Under-21 Provincial Championship Group B
 2015 Under-19 Provincial Championship Group A
 2015 Under-19 Provincial Championship Group B

References

2015
2015 Currie Cup